RV Tellina (LT242) was a fisheries research vessel that was operated by the Ministry of Agriculture, Fisheries and Food (United Kingdom) - Directorate of Fisheries, now known as the Centre for Environment, Fisheries and Aquaculture Science (Cefas) between 1960 and 1981.

Construction and career
Tellina was constructed by Jones Buckie Slip & Shipyard Ltd., Buckie, Scotland (yard number 101), to replace the earlier research vessel . Tellina was launched in 1960, and built according to a design prepared by the United Kingdom White Fish Authority.  The specification called for the vessel to have a shallow draught so that she could work close inshore, and for her to be capable of using harbours that largely dried out at low water.  

While in service with the Ministry of Agriculture, Fisheries and Food (United Kingdom), Tellina was mostly engaged in inshore surveys of young flatfish all around the British Isles, herring and sprat in the Wash, Humber and Thames estuary and of inshore shellfish stocks (crab, lobster, scallops whelks). Tellina operated out of the port of Lowestoft.

In 1982 Tellina was sold into private ownership, and renamed Dawn Hunter. In 1984, 1986, 1987 and 1988 Dawn Hunter was re-hired by the Ministry of Agriculture, Fisheries and Food (United Kingdom) to continue her earlier work surveying young flatfish along the English East coast, herring in the Thames estuary but also Nephrops (Norway lobster) fishing grounds of northeast England. In 1984-1988 she was listed as being owned by Captain John Cole, and based out of Whitby, Yorkshire.

She was briefly owned by the proprietor of Belfast Marine and was subsequently rebuilt into a luxury yacht, according to a design by G.L. Watson & Co. (Liverpool). Dawn Hunter was fitted out as a ketch (a two-masted sailing craft). She is primarily constructed of pitch pine planking on oak frames with mahogany superstructure. Dawn Hunter was listed as being for sale (for a price of GB £ 235,000), in Poole Harbour, Dorset in 2018, and was subsequently sold to an unknown buyer.

Service as a fisheries research vessel

Tellina (LT242) was in service with Ministry of Agriculture, Fisheries and Food from August 1960 until October 1981, during which time she participated in 281 separate research campaigns. She was largely confined to inshore coastal waters including the Humber estuary, East Anglia, Thames estuary, Cardigan Bay, North Wales and English Channel (Cornwall, Devon and Dorset).

During mid-April 1963, Tellina made an exploratory trawl survey around the Channel Islands and M.R. Vince took the opportunity to question local fishermen about deaths amongst marine animals during the excessively severe winter of 1962–63 in the United Kingdom now known as the "big freeze."

In June 1970 Tellina was used to conduct a series of fishing gear trials, whereby a team of scuba divers was employed to observe and photograph the seabed both in front of, and immediately behind a moving trawl. During each trial, two divers "rode" on the headline of the net, taking photographs or filming the action of the gear, and making occasional excursions forward along the net wings or back to the cod-end. This extremely hazardous procedure would likely not be allowed today and has been made unnecessary by the use of automatic cameras attached to fishing gears.

Studies aboard Tellina in the early 1960s showed that the young stages of commercially important flatfish, particularly sole and plaice, could be found in inshore nursery grounds, but that there was no information on the size or extent of these juvenile populations. Further surveys of the inshore waters of England between 1970 and 1972 revealed the general extent of the nursery grounds for the first time, and identified areas that were particularly important for the survival and growth of young fish. These early surveys subsequently evolved into an annual Young Fish Survey (YFS), that continued uninterrupted from 1981 up until 2010, and included multiple sites all along the North Sea coast, the Thames estuary and English Channel (especially around the Solent).

Tellina was used extensively to investigate the distribution and abundance of 0-group (juvenile) herring, using beach seine and midwater trawls. This survey made use of early echo-sounding techniques. The larval surveys, which had been started in 1956 (aboard the vessels Onaway and ) were continued on an international basis, and an annual pre-recruit survey was inaugurated by the International Council for the Exploration of the Sea (ICES) in 1963. Tellina was also used for investigations into other pelagic species of commercial importance, most notably sprat in the Wash, Thames Estuary and southern North Sea as well as in Tor Bay in the English Channel.

See also
 Centre for Environment, Fisheries and Aquaculture Science

References

1960 ships
Ships of the Centre for Environment, Fisheries and Aquaculture Science
Research vessels of the United Kingdom